Arome Bakery is a Hong Kong-based Japanese-style chain bakery. It operates over 50 shops in Hong Kong. It was founded in the 1980s by Ching-Po Yu and his daughter Man-Ying Yu, who are also the founders of Hong Kong Construction, the Hong Kong branch of Kumagai Gumi. Arome was acquired by Maxim's Catering, which is owned by Dairy Farm International Holdings in 2008.

2022 animal cruelty campaign
Arome Bakery has been targeted by a campaign claiming they use animal cruelty in their supply chain across Asia  This campaign claims Arome Bakery and all Maxim's Group restaurants use eggs from battery cages that are banned by the European Union Council Directive 1999/74/EC.

See also
 List of bakeries

References

External links
 Arome Bakery

Bakeries of Hong Kong
DFI Retail Group
Retail companies of Hong Kong
Hong Kong brands